The 2019 Sakhir Formula 2 round was a pair of motor races for Formula 2 cars that took place on 30 and 31 March 2019 at the Bahrain International Circuit in Sakhir, Bahrain as part of the FIA Formula 2 Championship. It was the first round of the 2019 FIA Formula 2 Championship and ran in support of the 2019 Bahrain Grand Prix.

Classification

Qualifying

Feature race

Sprint race 

Notes
 – Giuliano Alesi originally finished 18th but was disqualified.

Championship standings after the round 

Drivers' Championship standings

Teams' Championship standings

References

External links 
 

Bahrain
Sakhir Formula 2
Sakhir Formula 2